Calixto Gabriel Bravo Serrano (born April 6, 1991), known professionally as Xcelencia, is a Puerto Rican songwriter and musician born in Caguas, Puerto Rico of both Puerto Rican and Cuban descent.

Early life and career beginnings 
Born in Caguas, Puerto Rico in 1991, to a Puerto Rican mother and Cuban father, Xcelencia's family moved to the United States in 1996 in search of a new life and opportunities. Xcelencia got his start in 2012 with the release of his single “Gravedad” which won the “El Headliner” prize presented by MTV Tres and OurStage and was featured on Music My Güey, Free Latin Music, Blogamole and Lo Que Te Pica.”  The following year Xcelencia released his first single “Estilito Que Enamora” along with the music video which was also featured by MTV3's Dame Un Break.

2014-2016: Underrated, MTV3, and awards 
In 2014, Xcelencia released his first mixtape titled “Underrated” which featured his most popular songs and his debut singles, “Estilito Que Enamora”, “My Baby”, and “Beleza Do Caribe.” 

As an unsigned artist he has built up significant momentum on his own, with features on MTV3, Sirius Xm Radio, his follow-up project Enigma  won an Independent Music Award for best Latin album in an event that was held in the Lincoln center in New York City. Xcelencia has also won the finalist and Grand Prize in the Latin category of the popular John Lennon Songwriting Contest back to back, he was also part of the Latin finalists in the International Songwriting Competition.

2017-2018 
In 2017 Xcelencia announced his new concept titled I Am: Xcelencia, an artist playlist on Spotify where he will be releasing a digital single every week on the platform before the release of his next official single. After the success of his last album reaching over 2 million plays across Spotify, Xcelencia announces new single in collaboration with independent distributor Symphonic Distribution

2019-present 
With more than 270,000 monthly listeners on Spotify from Chile, Mexico, Argentina or Peru, Xcelencia on March 22 released his latest single "Te Sigo Soñando" produced by Argentinian beat maker Shine, who has worked for artists like J Alvarez or Ken-Y, reaching 100,000 streams in its first week of release. On October 16, 2019, Xcelencia was announced as part of the first wave of performers invited to showcase at the SXSW 2020 music festival. New single Buscarte it out as part of a new album where Xcelencia will release a song every Friday across all the digital music platforms  Xcelencia was featured on SoundCloud Studio Sessions: The Bridge, a contest series that brings four talented artists together to make a hit record in under eight hours, the song "Winter in Miami" was released exclusively on SoundCloud Featured on Songtradr's monthly mixdown for a second time, Xcelencia talked about how he is coping with COVID19 as a recording artist and his newly launched recording studio.

Discography

Albums 
 Underrated (July 4, 2014) 
 Enigma (January 29, 2016)

Playlists 
 I Am: Xcelencia (August 18, 2017)
Insomnio (October 25, 2019)

EP's 
 Amnesia (November 9, 2018)

Singles 
 Estilito Que Enamora (2013)
 My Baby (2013)
 Beleza Do Caribe (2014)
 Loco Por Amarla (2015)
 Me Mata (2016)
 Privilegio (2018)
 Ocultos (2018)
 Letal (2018)
 Deja Vu (2018)
 Te Sigo Soñando (2019)
 Vybes (2019)
 Buscarte (2019)

Music Videos

Awards

References

External links
 
 
  
 

Puerto Rican reggaeton musicians
Spanish-language singers of the United States
21st-century Puerto Rican male singers
1991 births
Living people